The Distinguished Service Order is the highest decoration in the Argentine military. There is a Military Merit Order and a Civilian Merit Order.

The naval version is called the 

Grades: 
 Grand Cross
 Commander 
 Knight
Argentine Army
Orders, decorations, and medals of Argentina